Center Street Branch could refer to:

 A railway line in New Jersey owned by Conrail Shared Assets Operations
 A former railway line in Connecticut that was part of the Meriden, Waterbury and Connecticut River Railroad